Alexander Hauser (born 23 June 1984) is an Austrian football coach and a former player.

References

1984 births
Living people
Austrian footballers
Association football defenders
Austrian Football Bundesliga players
2. Liga (Austria) players
SW Bregenz players
ASKÖ Pasching players
SC Schwanenstadt players
TSV Hartberg players
SK Austria Kärnten players
SC Wiener Neustadt players
FC Wacker Innsbruck (2002) players
Rangers F.C. players
Austrian expatriate sportspeople in Scotland
Austrian expatriate footballers
Expatriate footballers in Scotland
FC Red Bull Salzburg non-playing staff